Poseidon Pass is a pass about  high on the east side of the Antarctic Peninsula. It leads from Mobiloil Inlet to Larsen Ice Shelf between Cape Keeler and Cape Mayo. It was photographed from the air by the Ronne Antarctic Research Expedition (RARE) in December 1947 and roughly surveyed from the ground by the Falkland Islands Dependencies Survey (FIDS) in November 1947. It was used by the east coast geological party from Stonington Island in November 1960 and was found to provide an ideal sledge route. It was named by the United Kingdom Antarctic Place-Names Committee (UK-APC) after Poseidon, god of the sea and of earthquakes in Greek mythology.

Mountain passes of Graham Land
Bowman Coast